Three Steps Above Heaven (stylized as 3MSC) is a 2010 Spanish romantic drama film directed by Fernando González Molina which stars Mario Casas and María Valverde. Written by Ramón Salazar, it is based on the novel by Federico Moccia.

Cast

Production 
The film was produced by Cangrejo Films, Globomedia, Zeta Cinema, and Antena 3 Films.

Release 
The film was released theatrically in Spain on 3 December 2010.

Sequels 
The film spawned a 2012 sequel, I Want You.

Accolades 

|-
| align = "center" | 2011 || 25th Goya Awards || Best Adapted Screenplay || Ramón Salazar Hoogers ||  || align = "center" | 
|}

See also 
 List of Spanish films of 2010

References

External links
 
 

2010 films
2010 romantic drama films
2010s Spanish films
2010s Spanish-language films
Atresmedia Cine films
Films based on Italian novels
Films directed by Fernando González Molina
Spanish romantic drama films
Warner Bros. films
Zeta Studios films